Keith Wooldridge (born 24 October 1943) is a former professional tennis player from the United Kingdom who was active in the 1960s. He was born in Stoke-on-Trent, England.

His best singles result at a Grand Slam tournament was reaching the third round at Wimbledon in 1964 and 1966. He also reached the third round at the Australian Championships in 1963, but this was due to two walkovers in the first rounds.

After his active playing career, he was employed by the LTA as a development coach for female players from 1995 until his retirement in 2005.

Personal life
He married Scottish tennis player Winnie Shaw in 1972.

References

External links
 
 
 Eurosport profile

English male tennis players
Sportspeople from Stoke-on-Trent
1943 births
Living people
Tennis people from Staffordshire
British male tennis players